Pizzoli is a surname. Notable people with the surname include:

 Caio Pizzoli, Brazilian ten-pin bowler
 Davide Pizzoli (born 1999), Italian motorcycle racer
 Emiliano Pizzoli (born 1974), Italian hurdler
 Gioacchino Pizzoli (1651–1733), Italian painter

See also

 Pizzoli